The Louisville Astronomical Society (LAS) was founded in 1931 in Louisville, Kentucky by a group of amateur astronomers, including James Gilbert Baker.The society holds regular observing sessions and star parties.

Membership

Membership to the society is open to all in the Louisville, Kentucky area. Memberships are available through their website.

Events

Each month on a chosen Saturday, a local star viewing occurs at the society's Urban Astronomy Center (UAC), located at Louisville's Tom Sawyer State Park.

Publications

The society publishes the  Starword, a monthly publication focused on societal discussions and outlining upcoming important astrological events in the area.

Locations

See also
 List of astronomical societies

References

Further reading

External links
  Louisville Astronomical Society
 Clear Sky Chart for Louisville Kentucky 
 Clear Sky Chart for LAS Observatory in Curby, Indiana

Non-profit organizations based in Louisville, Kentucky
Amateur astronomy
Amateur astronomy organizations
Scientific organizations established in 1931
1931 establishments in Kentucky